This is a list of famous or notable people born in, or associated with, Birmingham in England, who have a Wikipedia page.

Famous people born in West Midlands

A–F

Walter Abbott (1877–1941) – Footballer
Colin Abrahall (born 1961) – Singer
Gabriel Agbonlahor (born 1986) – Footballer
Moeen Ali (born 1987) – England cricketer
Dennis Amiss (born 1943) – Cricketer and Warwickshire Administrator
Keith Arkell (born 1961) – English Chess champion, 2008
Stephen Arlen (1913–1972) – Opera manager
Ian Ashbee (born 1976) – Footballer
Francis William Aston (1877–1945) – Nobel Prize winner, Physicist
Ian Atkins (born 1957) – Footballer
Albert Austin (1882–1953) – Silent film star
Jack Badham (1919–1992) – Footballer
Annette Badland (born 1950) – Actress
Kenny Baker (1934–2016) – Actor
Sir Michael Balcon (1896–1977) – Film director
Pato Banton (born 1961) – Reggae artist
Dave Barnett (born 1967) – Footballer
Simon Bates (born 1946) – Radio DJ
Blaze Bayley (born 1963) – Musician, vocalist of Wolfsbane and Iron Maiden
Ian Bell (born 1982) – England Cricketer, Warwickshire CCC Captain
Moazzam Begg (born 1968) – Outreach Director
Edward White Benson (1829–1896) – Archbishop of Canterbury
Bev Bevan (born 1944) – Musician
Sharon Birch (born 1970? BC?) - Firefighter
Alfred Bird (1811–1878) – Inventor of custard powder
Sir Alfred Frederick Bird (1849–1922) – Food manufacturer and chemist
William Bloye – (1890–1975) Sculptor
Elizabeth Baker Bohan (1849–1930) – Author, journalist, artist, social reformer
Daniel Boone (born 1942) – Musician
Sarah Booth (1793–1867) – Actress
Matthew Boulton (1728–1809) – Pioneering industrialist and member of the Lunar Society
Jon Bounds (born 1975) – Blogger, humorist
Paul Braddon (1864–1937) — Artist
Peter Bradley (born 1953) – Politician
William Bragge (1823–1884) – Civil engineer/Antiquarian
Tony Britton (1924–2019) – Actor
James Jaysen Bryhan (born 1978) – Actor
Dan Bull (born 1986) – Musician/ Youtuber
Edward Burne-Jones (1833–1898) – Pre-Raphaelite painter and William Morris Associate
Trevor Burton (born 1949) – Musician
Geezer Butler (born 1949) – Bassist, Black Sabbath
George Cadbury (1839–1922) – Son of John Cadbury, Founder of the Cadbury chocolate company
John Cadbury (1801–1889) – Founder of the Cadbury chocolate company
Richard Cadbury (1835–1899) – Son of John Cadbury, Founder of the Cadbury chocolate company
Pogus Caesar (born 1953) – TV Director and photographer
Daniel Caines – (born 1979) track and field athlete
Ali Campbell (born 1959) and Robin Campbell (born 1954) – Musician, UB40
Duncan Campbell (born 1958) – Musician
David Cannadine (born 1950) – Historian
Bob Carolgees (born 1948) – TV Presenter (Tiswas and Surprise Surprise)
Lee Carsley (born 1974) – Footballer
Darren Carter (born 1983) – Footballer
John Carter (born 1940) – Musician
Barbara Cartland (1901–2000) – Novelist
Jasper Carrott (born 1945) – Comedian
Austen Chamberlain (1863–1937) – Politician
Neville Chamberlain (1869–1940) – Prime Minister
Gary Childs (born 1964) – Footballer
Adrian Chiles (born 1967) – Broadcaster
Carl Chinn (born 1956) – Historian, broadcaster, writer
Charlie Christodoulou (c. 1951–1976) – Soldier and mercenary
Ian Clarkson (born 1970) – Footballer
Lisa Clayton (born 1958) – Solo yachtswoman
Janice Connolly (born 1954) – Comedy actress
Raymond Teague Cowern (1913–1986) – Artist
Edward Cowie (born 1943) – Composer
Andy Cox (born 1956) – Ska guitarist (Fine Young Cannibals and The Beat)
David Cox (1783–1859) – Artist
Lauren Crace (born 1986) – Actress
Sarah Crompton (1802–1881) – children's writer
Chris Crudelli (born 1972) – Martial artist
John Curry (1949–1994) – Olympic and World Champion figure skater
Nigel Dakin (born 1964), Soldier, Diplomat and Governor of the Turks and Caicos Islands
Richard Dandy (born 1977) – former cricketer
Arthur Darvill (born 1982) – Actor and singer
Aidan Davis (born 1997) – Dancer and TV Presenter
Lindsey Davis (born 1949) – Historical Novelist
Cat Deeley (born 1976) – Television presenter
Nathan Delfouneso (born 1991) – Footballer
Oscar Deutsch (1893–1941) – Founder of the Odeon Cinemas chain
Fred Dinenage (born 1942) – Presenter, broadcaster, author
Stefflon Don (born 1991) – Musician
Don Dorman (1922–1997) – Paratrooper, 1st Airborne Division, footballer, manager and scout
K.K. Downing (born 1951) – Musician
Mark Duffus "Sure Shot" (born 1967) – Musician
Pete Dunne (born 1993) – Professional Wrestler
Dutchavelli (born 1993) – Rapper 
Jessie Eden (1902–1986) – Communist activist and trade union leader 
Leon Edwards (born 1991) – Professional mixed martial artist, current UFC Welterweight Champion
Electribe 101 – Electronic music groups who found fame in the early 90s
Hunt Emerson (born 1952) – Cartoonist
Ian Emes (born 1949) – Animator
Frederick Rowland Emett (1906–1990) – Cartoonist, artist and kinetic sculptor
Jo Enright (born 1968) – Actress and comedian
Dan Evans (born 1990) - Tennis player
Niki Evans (born 1972) – Singer
Trevor Eve (born 1951) – Actor
Earl Falconer (born 1957) – Bass player, UB40
Frank Farrell (1947–1997) – Rock bassist and co-writer of chart hit "Moonlighting"
Sid Field (1904–1950) – Comedian
Robert Firth (1887–1966) – Footballer and Real Madrid Manager
Philip Edward Fisher (born 1979) – Musician
Simon Fletcher (born 1948) – Artist
Sarah Florry (1744-1843) metal dealer 
Winston Foster (born 1941) – Footballer
Mark Frost (born 1968) – Actor
Kevin Francis (born 1967) – Footballer
Harry Freeman – (1858–1922) Music hall performer
Edward Augustus Freeman (1823–1892) – Historian, architectural artist and liberal politician
Fuzzbox – late 1980s girl band

G–M

Sir Francis Galton (1822–1911) – Scientist, founder of eugenics
Albert Gardner (1887–1923) – Footballer
Mike Gayle (born 1970) – Author
Helen George (born 1984) – Actress
GeoWizard (born 1990) – YouTuber
Steve Gibbons (born 1941) – Musician
Jon Gittens (1964–2019) – Footballer
John Goldingay (born 1942) – Theologian, currently a Professor of Old Testament, Fuller Theological Seminary, Pasadena, California
Jaki Graham (born 1956) – Soul singer
Jack Grealish (born 1995) – Footballer
Mark "Barney" Greenway (born 1969) – Musician, Napalm Death
Tom Grosvenor (1908–1972) – Footballer
George Dickinson Hadley (1908–1984) – Gastroenterologist
Rob Halford (born 1951) – Musician, Judas Priest
Charlie Hall (1899–1959) – Actor, most famous for his work with Laurel and Hardy
Alison Hammond (born 1975) – Television presenter and actress
Richard Hammond (born 1969) – Television presenter
John Hampson (1901–1955) – Novelist
Tony Hancock (1924–1968) – Comedian and actor
Ian Handysides (1962–1990) – Footballer
Nic Harcourt (born 1957) – an American radio personality
Nick Harding (born 1969) - Chief Medical Officer at Operose Health
David Harewood (born 1965) – Actor
Wally Harris (1900–1933) – Footballer
Julia Hartley-Brewer (born 1968) – Journalist and TV panelist
Norman Hassan (born 1958) – Percussionist, UB40
Phil Hawker (born 1962) – Footballer
William Haywood (1876–1957) – Architect, town planner, and secretary of Birmingham Civic Society
John Hemming (born 1960) – Member of Parliament and businessman
Lee Hendrie (born 1977) – Aston Villa, later Basford United F.C. midfielder
Duane Henry (born 1985) – Actor
Michael Higgs (born 1962) – Actor
Ian Hill (born 1951) – Musician
Jacqueline Hill (1929–1993) – Actress
Ken Hodge (born 1944) – National Hockey League player
George Holyoake (1817–1906) – Reformer
Jack Hood (1902–1992) – Boxer
Martha Howe-Douglas (born 1980) – Actress
Dorothy Howell (1898–1982) – Musician
Mr. Hudson (born 1979) – Singer
Alex Hughes – (born 1971) Cartoonist
David Hughes (1925–1972) – Operatic tenor
Geoff Humpage (born 1954) – Cricketer
Al Hunter Ashton (1957–2007) – Actor
Raymond Huntley (1904–1990) – Actor
Kassem Ibadulla (born 1964) – Cricketer
Tony Iommi (born 1948) – Guitarist, Black Sabbath
Jamelia (born 1981) – R&B singer
Maureen Jennings (born 1939) – novelist
Claudia Jessie (born 1990) – Actress
Seth Johnson (born 1979) – Footballer, Derby
Ann Jones (born 1938) – Tennis player, former World No. 2, 8 Grand Slam titles, including Wimbledon champion in 1969
Digby Jones, Baron Jones of Birmingham (born 1955) – Director-General of the Confederation of British Industry
Felicity Jones (born 1983) – Actress
Geoffrey Jones – Business Historian
John Jones (1858–1937) – Cricketer
Justin Jones (born 1964) – Musician
Simon Huw Jones (born 1960) – Musician and photographer
Ace Kefford (born 1946) – Musician
Mike Kellie (1947–2017) – Musician, Spooky Tooth, The Only Ones
David Kelly (born 1965) – Republic of Ireland footballer
Albert Ketèlbey (1875–1959) – Composer
Sir Rupert Alfred Kettle (1817–1894) – County court judge and noted strike arbitrator
Guz Khan (born 1986) – Comedian
Robert Kilroy-Silk (born 1942) – Politician and television presenter
Lorna Laidlaw (born 1963) – Actress
Denny Laine (born 1944) – Paul McCartney and Wings
Frederick W. Lanchester (1868–1946) – Maker of the first petrol-driven car in Britain
Bunny Larkin (born 1936) – Footballer
Bob Latchford (born 1951) – Footballer
Dave Latchford (born 1949) – Footballer
Peter Latchford (born 1952) – Footballer
Ian Lavender (born 1946) – Actor
Alfred Law (1862–1919) – Warwickshire cricketer and umpire
Stewart Lee (born 1968) - Comedian
Russell Leetch (born 1982) – Musician
Joleon Lescott (born 1982) – Footballer with Manchester City, Everton, Wolverhampton Wanderers
Adrian Lester (born 1968) – Actor
Dick Lilley (1866–1929) – England and Warwickshire Cricketer
John Lodge (born 1945) – Musician
Jane C. Loudon (1807–1858) – Author of Prose and Verse and The Mummy
Joseph Lucas (1834–1902) – Founder of Lucas Industries
Joe Lycett (born 1988) – Comedian
Jeff Lynne (born 1947) – Musician; co-founder of the Electric Light Orchestra
Clare Maguire (born 1988) – Musician born in Solihull but a resident of London
Nigel Mansell (born 1953) – Sportsman, F1 driver
Lee Mantle (1851–1934) – U.S. Senator from Montana
Sarah Manners (born 1975) – Actress
Tony Martin (born 1957) – Musician, singer of Black Sabbath
Eric Maschwitz (1901–1969) – lyricist
Herbert Mason  (1891–1960) – Film director, producer, stage actor, stage manager, choreographer, and army officer in the First World War
Hilary Mason (1917–2006) – Actor
Nick Mason (born 1944) – Musician, Pink Floyd; did not reside in Birmingham
Robert McCracken (born 1968) – Boxer, Commonwealth Middleweight champion, and World Title challenger
Zena McNally (born 1979) – Singer, Mis-Teeq
Christine McVie (1943-2022) – Musician, Fleetwood Mac
Gil Merrick (1922–2010) – Footballer and club manager
Ken Miles (1918–1966) – Sports Car Racing Driver / Engineer
Shazia Mirza – Comedian
Mist (born 1992) – Rapper
Alan Moore (born 1950) – Musician
William Moore (1916–2000) – Actor
Anisa Morridadi (born 1990) – Social entrepreneur
Everett Morton (1950–2021) – Drummer, The Beat
Henry Vollam Morton (1892–1979) – Journalist and travel writer
Peter Mucklow (born 1949) – Cricketer
George Muntz (1794–1857) – Pioneering industrialist and MP
Laura Mvula (born 1986) – singer-songwriter
Stanley Myers (1930–1993) – Film music composer
M1llionz (born 1997) – British rapper 
Malkit Singh (born c. 1963) – Punjabi Bhangra Singer

N–Z

Constance Naden – (1858–1889) Poet and philosopher
Alan Napier – (1903–1988) Actor
Ritchie Neville – (born 1979) Singer from 5ive
Ernie Newman – (1887–?) Professional footballer
Ernest Willmott Norton – (1889–1972) Cricketer
Ocean Colour Scene – Band from Moseley
Oceans Ate Alaska – Metalcore Band
Ursula O'Leary – (1926–1993) Actress
John Oliver – (born 1977) Comedian, host of Last Week Tonight, and former 'Senior British Correspondent' of The Daily Show
Ozzy Osbourne – (born 1948) Singer, Black Sabbath
Anri Okita – (born 1986) Singer and former pornographic actress
Carl Palmer – (born 1950) Musician, Emerson, Lake & Palmer
Janet Parker – (1938–1978) Medical photographer and last recorded person to die from smallpox
Kay Parker – (1944–2022) Pornographic actress
Alexander Parkes – (1813–1890) Inventor of the world's first plastic
Henry Parkes - (1815-1896) Australian politician, "Father of Federation"
Norman Partridge – (1900–1982) Warwickshire Cricketer
Liam Payne – (born 1993) Singer in the British/ Irish band One Direction
Dave Pegg – (born 1947) Musician, Fairport Convention, Jethro Tull
Stephen Perryman – (born 1955) Warwickshire Cricketer
Gerry Peyton – (born 1956) Footballer and goalkeeper coach
James and Oliver Phelps – (born 1986) Harry Potter movie actors
Jess Phillips – (born 1981) Politician
Michael Pinder – (born 1941) Musician, The Moody Blues
Jacki Piper – (born 1946) Actress
Sadie Plant – (born 1964) Author
John Poole – (1926–2009) Sculptor
Enoch Powell – (1912–1998) Politician, poet and classical scholar
Peter Powell – (born 1951) Disc jockey
Bernard Quaife – (1899–1984) Cricketer
Alfred Radcliffe-Brown – (1881–1955) Anthropologist
Ranking Roger – (1963–2019) Musician, The Beat
Mick Rathbone – (born 1958) Footballer
Adil Ray – (born 1974) Actor, comedian, and radio/television presenter
Nick Rhodes – (born 1962) Musician, Duran Duran
Micah Richards – (born 1988) Manchester City F.C defender
Walter Richards – (1863–1917) Cricketer and umpire
Pat Roach – (1937–2004) Actor and wrestler
Dave Robinson – (1948–2016) Footballer
John Rogers – (1505–1555) Bible editor and martyr
Sax Rohmer (Arthur Henry Sarsfield Ward) – (1883–1959) Novelist
Mark Rowley – (born 1964) Commissioner of Police of the Metropolis (London)
Adam Ruckwood – (born 1974) Swimming Commonwealth Champion (200m Backstroke)
Les Ross – (born 1949) Radio DJ
Mary Anne Schimmelpenninck – (1778–1856) Author on Women in society and religion, slavery abolitionist
Gary Shaw – (born 1961) Footballer
Martin Shaw – (born 1945) Actor
Visanthe Shiancoe – (born 1980) American football player
Sukshinder Shinda – English-born Punjabi music producer and artist
Graham Short – (born 1946) International Micro-Artist
Paul Simm – Musician
John Simmit – (born 1963) Actor and comedian best known for playing Dipsy on Teletubbies from 1997–2001
Jane Sixsmith – (born 1967) Hockey player
1st Viscount Slim of Yarralumla and Bishopston – (1891–1970) Military Commander
Sarah Smart – (born 1977) Actress
Alan Smith – (born 1936) Cricketer and England selector
Joshua Toulmin Smith – (1816–1869) Political theorist
Tiger Smith – (1886–1979) England and Warwickshire cricketer
Maya Sondhi – (born 1983) Actress
Sir Benjamin Stone – (1838–1914) Pioneering photographer
Dean Sturridge – (born 1973) Footballer
Daniel Sturridge – (born 1989) Footballer
Simon Sturridge – (born 1969) Footballer
Ernest Suckling – (1890–1962) Cricketer
Phil Summerill – (born 1947) Footballer
James Sutton – (born 1983) Actor
Andrew Symonds – (1975–2022) Cricketer
Connie Talbot – (born 2022) Singer/Musician
John Taylor – (born 1960) Musician, Duran Duran
Roger Taylor – (born 1960) Musician, Duran Duran
Bobby Thomson – (born 1943) Footballer
Will Thorne – (1857–1946) Trade union leader and MP
Charlie Tickle – (1884–1960) Footballer
Andrew Tiernan – (born 1965) Actor
Charlie Timmins – (1922–2010) Footballer
James Vaughan – (born 1988) Tranmere Rovers FC striker
Johnny Vincent – (1947–2006) Footballer
Murray Walker – (1923–2021) Racing driver and commentator
Kate Walsh – (born 1981) TV presenter-Live from Studio Five
Julie Walters – (born 1950) Actress
Bill Ward – (born 1948) Drummer, Black Sabbath
Clint Warwick – (1940–2004) Musician, The Moody Blues
Carl Wayne – (1943–2004) Musician, The Move, The Hollies
Graham Webb – (1944–2017) World Amateur Road Race Champion 1967
Brooke Foss Westcott – (1825–1901) Theologian and Bishop of Durham
Peter Weston – (1943–2017) Influential British science fiction fan
Ian Westwood – (born 1982) Cricketer
Fred Wheldon – (1869–1924) Footballer
Toyah Willcox – (born 1958) Singer and television presenter
Emma Willis – (born 1976) Model
George Willis-Pryce – (1866–1949) Artist
Jimmy Windridge – (1882–1939) England footballer
Refraction – Famous Minecraft youtuber and streamer
Muff Winwood – (born 1943) Musician
Steve Winwood – (born 1948) Musician — solo and co-founder, Traffic
Colin Withers – (1940–2020) Footballer
Chris Woakes – (born 1989) England and Warwickshire cricketer
Chris Wood – (1944–1983) Musician; co-founder, Traffic
Roy Wood – (born 1976) Musician, co-founder of the Electric Light Orchestra
Richie Woodhall – (born 1968) World Boxing Champion
John Wyndham – (1903–1969) Author
Kal Yafai – (born 1989) World champion boxer
Dorian Yates – (born 1962) 6x Mr. Olympia
Mark Yates – (born 1970) Footballer and manager
Benjamin Zephaniah – (born 1958) Poet

Lived in or associated with Birmingham
 

W. H. Auden – (1907–1973) Poet and author
W. V. Awdry – (1911–1997) Author of The Railway Series
Sir Granville Bantock – (1868–1946) Composer
Connor Ball – (born 1996) Bassist and singer, The Vamps
John Baskerville – (1707–1775) Printer and inventor of typefaces
Marie Bethell Beauclerc – (1845–1897) First female shorthand teacher and reporter in England
William Booth – (1776–1812) Forger
John Bright –  (1811–1889) Politician
Herbert Tudor Buckland – (1869–1951) Architect
Elihu Burritt – (1810–1879) US consul to Birmingham
Pogus Caesar – (born 1953) Broadcaster and artist
Jazzy B – (born 1975) Punjabi singer
Joseph Chamberlain – (1836–1914) Politician, Mayor of Birmingham
Bruce Chatwin – (1940–1989) Author
Lee Child – (born 1954) Author
George Dawson – (1821–1876) Preacher
Arthur Conan Doyle – (1859–1930) Author of Sherlock Holmes
John Boyd Dunlop – (1840–1921) Industrialist, built Fort Dunlop
Rev. Richard Enraght – (1837–1898) Vicar, religious controversialist
 Reuben Fitzpatrick – YouTuber
Allan Ford – (born 1968) Soldier, convicted of manslaughter
Philippa Forrester – (born 1968) Television presenter, attended Birmingham University
Foji Gill – Singer, music producer
Joseph Gillott – (1799–1872) Industrialist
Tommy Godwin – (1920–2012) Racing cyclist and Olympic medallist
Ashia Hansen – (born 1971) Track and field athlete
James Hinks – (1829–1878) Bred the Bull Terrier dog
William Ick – (1800–1844) Botanist
Washington Irving – (1783–1859) Author
Elizabeth "Tetty" Johnson – (1689–1752) wife of Samuel Johnson
John Joubert – (1927–2019) South African-born composer
Roi Kwabena – (1956–2008) Author
Simon Le Bon – (born 1958) Studied drama at the University of Birmingham before joining Duran Duran in 1980
Louis MacNeice – (1907–1963) Poet
Stuart Maconie – (born 1961) Radio DJ and television presenter
Josiah Mason – (1795–1881) Industrialist and philanthropist
Nigel Mansell – (born 1953) Racing driver
Cardinal Newman – (1801–1890) Theologian and founder of the English Oratory
William McGregor – (1846–1911) Instrumental in forming the football league
William Murdoch – (1754–1839) Inventor of gas lighting
Bill Oddie – (born 1941) Comedian and ornithologist
Syed Farradino Omar – Television presenter and producer
John Peel – (1939–2004) Radio DJ
Geoffrey Pernell – (born 1971) Soldier, convicted of manslaughter
Joseph Priestley – (1733–1804) Chemist and dissenting clergyman
Sir Simon Rattle – (born 1955) conductor of CBSO 1980–1998
John Ray – (1627–1705) "Father of English natural history"
Sir Peter Rigby – (born 1943) Entrepreneur
Mary Rollason (1764/5 - 1835) steel toy maker and businesswoman
Kevin Rowland – (born 1953) Singer for Dexys Midnight Runners, formed in Birmingham
Frank Skinner – (born 1957) Comedian
Mike Skinner – (born 1979) Musician, The Streets
Meera Syal – (born 1961) Actor, Writer
Dave Swarbrick – (1941–2016) Musician
J. R. R. Tolkien – (1892–1973) Author
Joshua Toulmin – (1740–1815) Non-conformist preacher
Ruby Turner – (born 1958) Singer (Originally from Montego Bay, Jamaica)
UB 40 – Reggae group
James Watt – (1736–1819) Inventor and member of the Lunar Society
Una White – (1938/9–1997) Subject of public art-work
William Withering – (1741–1799) Doctor, discoverer of digitalis
Victoria Wood – (1953–2016) Actress
John Skirrow Wright – (1822–1880) Social improver
Alastair Yates – (1952–2018) Radio and television presenter
Malala Yousafzai – (born 1997) Pakistani Activist
Lauren Zhang – (born 2001) winner of BBC Young Musician 2018 (Originally from Albuquerque, New Mexico, United States of America)

See also
Alumni of the University of Birmingham

References

External links
Famous People Birmingham City Council feature page on Birmingham-related celebrities
Blue Plaques erected by Birmingham Civic Society
The Great Bull Birmingham bus network map featuring local celebrities.

Birmingham, England
 
People